Stefania Giannini (born 18 November 1960) is an Italian politician and linguist. She served as Minister of Education, Universities and Research from 2014 until 2016. She is currently Assistant-Director General for Education at UNESCO in Paris.

Early career
Born in Lucca, Giannini in 1991 became a professor at the University for Foreigners in Perugia, holding the chairs of Phonetics and Phonology (1992-1994), Sociolinguistics (1994-1998) and of Glottology and Linguistics (1998-2013).  In 2004 she also became rector of the Perugia University for Foreigners. She was one of the first and youngest women to hold this position in Italy.

Political career
As a candidate in Tuscany with the Civic Choice party of Mario Monti, Giannini was elected senator in February 2013. In November the same year, she was appointed secretary and coordinator of the party Scelta civica.

As Senator of the Republic of Italy between 2013 – 2018 and Minister of Education, Universities and Research (2014 – 2016), she developed and implemented a structural reform of the Italian education system, centred on social inclusion and cultural awareness.

On 21 February 2014, Giannini was appointed as Minister of Education, University and Research in the government of Prime Minister Matteo Renzi. During Italy's presidency of the Council of the European Union in 2014, she also chaired the Education and Competitiveness Council of the European Union. She was succeeded by Valeria Fedeli in 2016.

From 2017, Giannini served as adviser to the European Commissioner for Research and Innovation Carlos Moedas.

Career with the United Nations
In 2018, UNESCO Director-General Audrey Azoulay appointed Giannini as one of four new members of the organization's senior management team. Giannini has since been serving as Assistant Director-General for Education, making her the top United Nations official in the field of education.

Other activities
 Global Education Monitoring Report (GEM), Member of the Advisory Board
 Global Partnership for Education (GPE), Member of the Board of Directors

Recognition
 2008 – Honorary degree, awarded by the College Reges-Rede Gonzaga De Ensino Superior (Brazil)
 2015 – America Award, presented by the Italy-USA Foundation

Bibliography
 Tra grammatica e pragmatica: la geminazione consonantica in latino (Giardini, 1989)
 Percorsi metalinguistici. Giuliano di Toledo e la teoria della grammatica (FrancoAngeli, 1996)
 La pubblicità comparativa. Una via europea (FrancoAngeli, 1999)
 Il cambiamento linguistico. Suoni, forme, costrutti, parole (Carocci editore, 2003)
 La fonologia dell'interlingua. Principi e metodi di analisi  (FrancoAngeli, 2003)

References

External links

 

1960 births
Living people
Linguists
Politicians from Lucca
Civic Choice politicians
21st-century Italian politicians
Academic staff of the University of Perugia
Education ministers of Italy
Members of the Senate of the Republic (Italy)
Renzi Cabinet
Women government ministers of Italy
21st-century Italian women politicians
Women members of the Senate of the Republic (Italy)